The murder of Kimberly Cates was a thrill killing that attracted national attention due to the brutality of the killers' crimes, the randomness by which the home was chosen with intent to murder everyone inside it (the victims and perpetrators did not know each other prior to the home invasion), the apparent lack of remorse of murderer Steven Spader, and the ages of the thrill killers when they committed murder.

On October 4, 2009, 17-year-old Spader and 19-year-old Christopher Gribble murdered Kimberly Cates (age 42) and severely maimed her 11-year-old daughter Jaimie during a home invasion in Mont Vernon, New Hampshire. Both victims were assaulted with a machete. Spader admitted to hacking Kimberley Cates to death with 36 blows to the head and torso.

A former Boy Scout, Spader was a high school dropout who passed the GED high school equivalency exam. Spader had formed a club he called "The Disciples of Destruction" shortly before the murder, to whom he recruited his confederates. Spader designed a logo with the initials D.O.D. Spader told his recruits that the home invasion was to be a rite of "initiation" for club members.

Both Spader and Gribble were sentenced to life in prison. Two accomplices who accompanied them, William Marks and Quinn Glover, were sentenced to 30-60 years and 20-40 years respectively.

Because of the U.S. Supreme Court's Miller v. Alabama 2012 ruling that circumscribed the sentencing of minors to life sentences, both Spader and Gribble were granted resentencing hearings. Apparently content with his life sentence, Spader informed his attorneys during an April 2013 resentencing hearing that he did not want a reduction in sentence, describing himself as "the most sick and twisted person you'll ever meet". He did not appear at the hearing.

The State of New Hampshire claimed that Spader lacked remorse, considering it "unnecessary" and a form of weakness, and likely would commit more crimes upon release from prison.

His sentence of life plus 76 years was upheld. In May 2013, the New Hampshire Supreme Court allowed Spader to drop the appeal of his conviction. His appellate attorney told the press that Spader did not want to appeal for "personal and moral reasons".  Spader was moved to a New Jersey prison in February 2014 and subsequently sustained injuries in a prison fight.
In October 2014, Gribble sought a reduction in his sentence for his non-murder charges based on his young age; the court did not rule immediately.

The murder led to the New Hampshire legislature expanding the crimes punishable by the death penalty to include murder during a home invasion. The state later repealed the penalty on May 30, 2019, after state senators overrode a veto by Governor Chris Sununu. Prisoners who were convicted of capital murders committed before that date did not have their sentences commuted to life in prison, as the abolishment was not retroactive.

See also 
 Capital punishment in New Hampshire

References 

2009 in New Hampshire
2009 murders in the United States
People murdered in New Hampshire
Deaths by person in New Hampshire
Mont Vernon, New Hampshire
October 2009 crimes in the United States
October 2009 events in the United States
Female murder victims
Deaths by blade weapons
Murder committed by minors